Defending champion Michael Chang defeated Stefan Edberg in a rematch of the previous year's final, 6–2, 7–5 to win the singles tennis title at the 1994 Cincinnati Masters.

Seeds

  Sergi Bruguera (third round)
  Stefan Edberg (final)
  Michael Stich (semifinals)
  Michael Chang (champion)
  Andrei Medvedev (second round)
  Todd Martin (withdrew)
  Jim Courier (quarterfinals)
  Boris Becker (third round)
  Thomas Muster (first round)
  Petr Korda (second round)
  Yevgeny Kafelnikov (second round)
  Wayne Ferreira (third round)
  Cédric Pioline (third round)
  Patrick Rafter (first round)
  Andrea Gaudenzi (first round)
  Jaime Yzaga (first round)

Draw

Finals

Top half

Section 1

Section 2

Bottom half

Section 3

Section 4

References
 Main draw

Singles